Charles Gaines, Jr. (born October 3, 1992) is a former American football cornerback. He played college football at Louisville.

High school
Gaines attended Miami Central High School in Miami, Florida, where he was part of the same graduating class as teammates Rakeem Cato, Tommy Shuler, Durell Eskridge and Devonta Freeman. As a senior, he helped lead his team to a class 6-A state title, recording a second quarter interception which he returned for a touchdown.

Considered a three-star recruit by Rivals.com, he was rated as the 43rd best wide receiver prospect of his class. On September 26, 2010, he accepted a scholarship and committed to the University of Louisville.

College career
Gaines redshirted as a true freshman in 2011, after enrolling early in January 2011 with Teddy Bridgewater. In 2012, as a wide receiver, he caught 11 passes for 172 yards and one touchdown, but missed the final five games of the season due to a suspension, his second one that year. He returned to the team in April 2013, where he was moved to cornerback. He played in all 13 games, making 11 starts. He recorded 22 tackles and a team leading five interceptions, and earned first-team All-American Athletic Conference (AAC) honors. In 2014, he started 11 games for the Cardinals, recording 36 tackles with two interceptions.

Following the season, he announced he would forgo his remaining eligibility and enter the 2015 NFL Draft.

Professional career

Cleveland Browns
Gaines drafted by the Cleveland Browns in the sixth round, 189th overall, of the 2015 NFL Draft. On May 10, 2015, Gaines signed a four-year, $2.402 million contract with the Browns, which included a $122,137 signing bonus. On September 3, 2016, he was released by the Browns.

Buffalo Bills
On December 7, 2016, Gaines was signed to the Bills' practice squad. He signed a reserve/future contract with the Bills on January 2, 2017. Gaines was waived by the Bills on May 25, 2017.

Jacksonville Jaguars
On July 31, 2017, Gaines signed with the Jacksonville Jaguars. He was waived/injured on August 20, 2017 and placed on injured reserve. He was released on August 25, 2017.

References

External links
Louisville Cardinals bio

1992 births
Living people
Players of American football from Miami
Miami Central Senior High School alumni
American football cornerbacks
Louisville Cardinals football players
Cleveland Browns players
Buffalo Bills players
Jacksonville Jaguars players